Daughter of the Sun is a 1962 sexploitation comedy film directed by Herschell Gordon Lewis and produced by David F. Friedman. The film follows the experiences of two young teachers at a nudist colony. Lewis and Friedman produced the film after the success of the 1961 nudie cutie The Adventures of Lucky Pierre.

Synopsis 
Schoolteacher Christine is forced to defend herself before the board of education when it becomes known that she is a member of a nudist colony. Curious about her account, young educator Keith Lawrence goes with her to the nudist colony so he can learn more about it.

Cast 

 Rusty Allen as Christine
 Jerome Eden as Keith Lawrence
 Michael Borgine as Grady Ives
 Pearl Krohn as Olive Simmons
 Rockwell Morrow as Narrator

Production 
The film followed up on the success of The Adventures of Lucky Pierre, a color film of the nudie cutie genre. Lewis and Friedman were determined to make a fourth film together, and decided to produce one in the nudist colony film genre, which was popular at the time. Since no nudist colonies existed near Chicago at the time, Lewis and Friedman relocated to film on location in Miami, Florida. Daughter of the Sun was the first of many of Lewis' films to be shot in Miami, and to star Jerome Eden who later became a frequent collaborator of Lewis.

Despite the box office success of Lucky Pierre, Lewis and Friedman did not feel they would be able to finance another color film quickly enough to capitalize on Lucky Pierre's success. Their solution was to shoot the majority of the film on cheaper black-and-white film, leaving the more expensive color film for the nude scenes. Rusty Allen, then working as a cigarette girl, was hired as the lead for her good looks and was billed as "the most beautiful woman in the world".

Reception 
Daughter of the Sun was a minor box office success and was screened in theatres for several years after its release, although it did not match the success of Lucky Pierre.

References

External links 

1962 films
1960s sex comedy films
Films directed by Herschell Gordon Lewis
American sexploitation films
1960s American films